Sajik-dong is a dong, or neighbourhood, of Jongno-gu in Seoul, South Korea.

See also 
Administrative divisions of South Korea

Notes

References

External links
 Jongno-gu Official site in English
 Jongno-gu Official site
 Status quo of Jongno-gu by administrative dong 
 Sajik-dong Resident office 
 Origin of Sajik-dong name

Neighbourhoods of Jongno-gu